Banque Sahélo-Saharienne pour l'Investissement et le Commerce is a commercial bank and investment bank serving several nations in Saharan and Sahelian Africa. The bank's headquarters are located in Libya.

Branches

A list of branches of BSIC with corresponding links to their AfricaPhonebook pages.

BSIC Guinée
BSIC Bénin
BSIC Burkina Faso
BSIC Tchad
BSIC Togo
BSIC Ghana
BSIC Libye
BSIC Mali
BSIC Niger
BSIC Sénégal
BSIC Soudan
Note: BSIC has temporarily moved its operational HQ to Tunis, due to the ongoing instability in Libya.

References

External links

BSIC Chad Homepage

Banks of Libya
Investment banks
Banks of Chad
Banks established in 1999
1999 establishments in Libya
Economy of Tripoli, Libya